Dajour Mcintosh-Buffonge (born 29 January 1996) is a Montserratian footballer who plays as a defender for Northwood.

Career

Club career 
Buffonge progressed through the youth ranks of Charlton Athletic and Tottenham Hotspur, before his release in 2012. He joined Hertford Town ahead of the 2012–13 season and became a regular in the side immediately.

Making 20 appearances in his opening two seasons, Buffonge then claimed the club's Young Player of the Year award for the 2014–15 season with four goals in 39 games. He then lined-up a further 26 times for the Blues during his 2015–16 campaign.

In December 2019, Buffonge joined Northwood.

International career 
Buffonge made his international debut for Montserrat on 27 March 2015, featuring in a 2–1 defeat to Curaçao during 2018 World Cup qualification. In September 2018, he received another call-up to the national team whilst playing for Redbridge.

Personal life 
Buffonge is the older brother of DJ Buffonge, who joined Manchester United in November 2015.

References

External links

1996 births
Living people
Footballers from Greater London
Montserratian footballers
Montserrat international footballers
British sportspeople of Antigua and Barbuda descent
English footballers
English people of Montserratian descent
English sportspeople of Antigua and Barbuda descent
Charlton Athletic F.C. players
Tottenham Hotspur F.C. players
Hertford Town F.C. players
Bedford F.C. players
A.F.C. Darwen players
Atherton Collieries A.F.C. players
Congleton Town F.C. players
Glossop North End A.F.C. players
Ware F.C. players
Northwood F.C. players
Association football defenders
Black British sportspeople